Orient is a city in Franklin County, Illinois,  United States. As of the 2010 census, the city population was 358, up from 296 at the 2000 census.

Geography
Orient is located in southern Franklin County at  (37.918839, -88.975973).

Demographics

As of the census of 2000, there were 296 people, 131 households, and 80 families residing in the city. The racial makeup of the city was 99.66% White and 0.34% African American.

There were 131 households, out of which 26.7% had children under the age of 18 living with them, 48.9% were married couples living together, 9.9% had a female householder with no husband present, and 38.2% were non-families. 34.4% of all households were made up of individuals, and 20.6% had someone living alone who was 65 years of age or older. The average household size was 2.26 and the average family size was 2.89.

In the city, the population was spread out, with 24.0% under the age of 18, 9.1% from 18 to 24, 27.0% from 25 to 44, 22.6% from 45 to 64, and 17.2% who were 65 years of age or older. The median age was 39 years. For every 100 females, there were 92.2 males. For every 100 females age 18 and over, there were 92.3 males.

The median income for a household in the city was $21,250, and the median income for a family was $22,188. Males had a median income of $21,250 versus $16,250 for females. The per capita income for the city was $8,713. About 22.2% of families and 19.0% of the population were below the poverty line, including 23.1% of those under the age of eighteen and 6.7% of those 65 or over.

References

Cities in Franklin County, Illinois
Cities in Illinois
Populated places in Southern Illinois